The Spiš Magura is a set of mountain ranges in northern Slovakia, part of the Podhale-Magura Area region of the Outer Western Carpathians.

The western and northern boundaries of the Spiš Magura are the international border with Poland.  Its highest point is Repisko (1259 meters).

See also 
 Geography of Slovakia

Mountain ranges of Slovakia
Mountain ranges of the Western Carpathians